Jan Kazimierz Denhoff (1649–1697) was a Polish cardinal from 1686, Abbot of the Mogiła Abbey in 1666, canon of Warsaw, Dean of Płock, a canon of Kraków in 1681 and Bishop of Cesena in 1688. He is the author of several theological works.

He was born in Warsaw as the son of the then royal courtier Teodor Denhoff and Katarzyna Franciszka von Bessen, mistress of king John II Casimir Vasa. Denhoff was educated at the Jesuit College at Pułtusk. In the days of John III Sobieski, Denhoff represented Polish interests in the Holy See in the Vatican. Denhoff held various positions in the Roman Curia, including the Supreme Court of the Apostolic Signatura. Pope Innocent XI created him Cardinal at the Consistory of 2 September 1686 and was appointed bishop of Cesena in 1687.

Cardinal Denhoff was camerling of the Sacred College in 1695 and 1696. He participated in the conclave of 1689, in which Alexander VIII was elected pope, and in that of 1691 (election of Innocent XII). Shortly before his death in 1697 he resigned from the Diocese of Cesena and died in Rome.

References

Literature 
 Edward Ozorowski, Denhoff Jan Kazimierz [w:] Słownik polskich teologów katolickich, t. 1, Warszawa 1981, pp. 384–385.

17th-century Polish cardinals
1649 births
1697 deaths
Polish Roman Catholic theologians
Canons of Kraków
Canons of Warsaw
Polish expatriates in Italy
Bishops of Cesena
Abbots of Mogiła
Jan Kazimierz Denhoff